Podsljeme is a city district situated in the foothills of Zagreb's mountain Medvednica and its name stands for "under Sljeme" (Sljeme is the peak of the Medvednica mountain). It has the status of četvrt (quarter, district, borough) and as such has an elected council. It is located about 5km north of central Zagreb.

Podsljeme had 19,165 residents in 2011. Its residents are mainly upper middle or upper class.

Podsljeme is an affluent part of Zagreb with a high cost per square meter, about 3500 Euros per square meter. Upper-middle-class homes and dense deciduous forest prevail in this area. Many of the city's tycoons, political personalities and celebrities live in the district.

List of neighborhoods in Podsljeme
 Šestine
 Gračani
 Prekrižje
 Mlinovi
 Bliznec
 Dolje
 Remete
 Markuševec

References

Districts of Zagreb